Glatz is a surname. Notable people with the surname include:

Ferenc Glatz (born 1941), Hungarian historian and academic
Ilse von Glatz (1958–2014), Canadian actress
Kaspar Glatz (died 1551), German minister

See also
Glatz (disambiguation)
Michael Glatze (born 1975), American activist
Glatzer, a surname